The Butterfly Lovers' Violin Concerto (《梁山伯与祝英台小提琴协奏曲》; often abbreviated ), along with the Yellow River Piano Concerto, is one of the most famous Chinese works of orchestral music. It is an adaptation of an ancient legend, the Butterfly Lovers. Written for a Western-style orchestra, it features a solo violin played using some Chinese techniques.

This concerto is written in traditional 5-note technique (pentatonic scale). It uses melodies from Shaoxing Opera, chord structures and patterns, and tries to imitate the playing techniques of Chinese musical instruments. This gives the piece a distinctive "Chinese" sound, though it uses tonal harmonies.

The concerto was written in 1959 by two Chinese composers, He Zhanhao (何占豪, born 1933) and Chen Gang (陈钢, born 1935), while they were students at the Shanghai Conservatory of Music. The work is a common feature in figure skating and in concert halls worldwide. This concerto is now often performed with Chinese instruments playing the violin part, the most common being Erhu, Pipa and Liuqin. In such cases the soloist is often accompanied by an orchestra consisting of Chinese instruments.

He Zhanhao is more widely credited for the composition of the concerto. However, his main contribution was the famous opening theme while most of the development was in fact written by Chen Gang. This was revealed in an interview of by China Central Television with several artists contributed in the creation and popularity of this piece of work in China and worldwide.

The 1959 premiere of the Butterfly Lovers Violin Concerto featured 18-year-old violinist Yu Lina and took place in Shanghai as part of the celebration of the 10th anniversary year of the founding of the People's Republic of China.  It was first recorded in 1959 with soloist Yu Lina on violin and the Symphony Orchestra of Shanghai Music Conservatory conducted by Fan Cheng-wu, and later by Shen Rong in 1961 with the same orchestra and conductor. The latter recording was re-released in 1977 by China Record Company. 

This piece is also adapted into other forms, including piano concerto by Chen Gang and piano solo by Sun Yilin (孙亦林, Jan 3, 1935 - Apr 5, 2015).

Story and musical elements

The concerto is in one movement, but is broken into seven distinct sections. Each tells a different part of the story of the Butterfly Lovers. Some of the melodies come from the Chinese Opera of the same name or from traditional Chinese folk songs. The solo violin of the concerto is symbolic of Zhu Yingtai, the story's protagonist, and the cello part is symbolic of Liang Shanbo, her lover.

I. Adagio Cantabile 
The concerto begins with two fifths in D by the harp, after which a solo flute opens with a flowery melody, setting the scene of the story. A solo oboe enters with the strings in G major, after which the solo violinist enters and begins a simple melody. This melody comes from a Chinese folk song of the Yellow River (Huanghe), and tells the story of Zhu Yingtai's childhood. The solo violin is accompanied by a harp and other elements of the orchestra. On the road to Hangzhou for her studies, Zhu (disguised as a man) meets Liang for the first time; a cello solo intertwines with the violin, bringing a new, but still melodious theme and modulating to D major. As the cello exits, the orchestral tutti plays the same melody of the solo violin, with occasional violin entrances in between. As the first buds of love begin to blossom, a short violin cadenza using mostly the G-pentatonic scale expresses Zhu's joy of her and Liang's oath of fraternity.

II. Allegro 
The orchestra begins the next section in E major, the violin entering with a fast and jovial melody, representing Zhu and Liang's busy three years of school. Many examples of violin technique are represented, namely spiccato, fast playing over a wide range of notes, and even arpeggios, in a standard display of difficulty for a violin concerto.

III. Adagio assai doloroso 
As the end of their schooling draws near, Liang and Zhu grow sad as they realize that their time together is nearly over. Zhu invites Liang to visit her family and to court her sister. He doesn't know that Zhu is really inviting him to marry her. Liang promises to see Zhu again, but Liang waits before doing so.

IV.  Pesante – Piu mosso – Duramente 
When Zhu returns home, she finds that her father has promised her to the son of a rich family. The solo violin struggles against the forces of the orchestra, representing her protests against her father.

V. Lagrimoso 
When Liang arrives, he sees Zhu and realizes that she is a woman, and they fall in love. The solo violin and cello solo play an emotional duet, one of the most famous and powerful sections of the work.

VI. Presto resoluto 
The love duet between the two is replaced by anger as Liang learns that in his absence, Zhu has been betrothed to another. The solo violin launches into a brilliant and difficult passage, supported by chords from the orchestra, but eventually returns to the original melody representing love, accompanied again by the cello solo. Liang becomes sick and dies as the duet draws to a close. Another virtuosic section for the solo and orchestra combines both the slow melodies and the fast energetic passages introduced before. The section ends with the suicide of Zhu as the solo violin ends with an abrupt high note.

VII. Adagio cantabile 
The lovers' parts are united by a final section, with the solo violin and the orchestra redeveloping the opening theme to build to a triumphant climax. The concerto ends bittersweetly with a final melodic phrase from the solo violin, concluding mysteriously on a high D from the strings. In the legend, Liang's grave opens and Zhu throws herself into the chasm; the ending portraying the lovers' transformation into butterflies, never to be separated again.

Instrumentation
This concerto is composed for solo violin, 2 flutes, 2 oboes, 2 clarinets in A, 2 bassoons, 4 horns, 2 trumpets, 3 trombones, timpani, percussion (gu ban, cymbal, tam-tam), harp, piano, and strings.

References

External links

Releasing Muse's Arrow to the World; brief autobiography of Chen Gang (translated from Chinese)

Chinese music
Violin concertos
Chinese classical music
1959 compositions